Kang Jagir is a medium size village in Phillaur tehsil of Jalandhar District of Punjab State, India. The village is administrated by Sarpanch who is elected representative of the village.

Caste 
The village has schedule caste (SC) constitutes 48.17% of total population of the village and it doesn't have any Schedule Tribe (ST) population.

Education 
The village has a Punjabi Medium, Co-educational primary school (Govt. Primary School) and a senior secondary school (Shaheed Baba Deep Singh Senior secondary school). The nearest government high school is located in Apra.

Landmarks 
The village has a famous Gurudwara Bhai Bala Sahib Ji which is located at the east entrance of the village and Guru Ravidas Ji Gurudwara which is located at the western side of the village. The village also has a Hindu temple.

The village does not have any bank or ATM facility and villagers have to travel to Apra.

Transport

Rail 

Air 

References 

Villages in Jalandhar district
Villages in Phillaur tehsil